Nefise Melek Sultan Hatun was an Ottoman princess, the daughter of Sultan Murad I of the Ottoman Empire. She was the wife of Prince Alaeddin Ali Bey of Karaman, the ruler of Karamanids, and was the mother of the next Karamanid ruler, Mehmed II of Karaman.

Life
Her father served her to try to calm Alaeddin Bey, the son and successor of Halil Bey, ruler of Karamanids. He therefore married her to him in 1378. In the early days of the reign of Murad, Alaeddin, tried to increase the embarrassment that the revolt of the landowners of Galatia had raised Murad, and to encourage the insurrection by a diversion powerful, excited the Warsaks to join the rebels' Angora; but the capture of the city and wedding of Nefise Hatun, Murad with Alaeddin, restored peace for some time. From that moment, the envious Alaeddin sought every opportunity to break the treaty which united the ruler of the Ottomans.

As seen, the union did not have the desired effect. Therefore, to resume hostilities with the participation of two of the sons of Murad I, Yakub Çelebi and Bayezid, therefore, brethren Nefise. Defeated, Alaeddin took refuge in Konya. To get out of this mess, he sent Nefise to her father, to ask for forgiveness from the Sultan.

According to Joseph von Hammer-Purgstall:

Alphonse de Lamartine tells the scene with more details:

In 1387 Nefise built the Theological College of Karaman. She at least had three sons: Mehmed II of Karaman (1379-1423), who was Alaeddinʻs successor after his death; Alaeddin Ali Bey (1381-1424) and Oğuz Bey (probably died in infancy).

Nefise died around 1400.

See also
Ottoman Empire
Ottoman dynasty

Annotations

References

Joseph von Hammer-Purgstall, History of the Ottoman Empire (1835).
Alphonse de Lamartine, History of Turkey (1851), 6 volumes.

Sources

1363 births
1400 deaths
14th-century Ottoman princesses